Danny Dyer's Deadliest Men (Danny Dyer's Deadliest Men 2: Living Dangerously in Series 2) is a documentary series broadcast on Bravo between 20 October 2008 and 28 September 2009. It followed Danny Dyer as he embarked on meeting men he considers deadly. The show has since been repeated on Sky One, Sky Two, and Pick.

Episodes

Series 1 (2008)

In series 1 Dyer met the featured person over a few days.

Series 2 (2009)

In a change to the format, Dyer stayed with the men featured on the series as the show was filmed.

References

External links

Danny Dyer's Deadliest Men at Virgin 1
Danny Dyer's Deadliest Men at Bravo
Danny Dyer's Deadliest Men at Sky

2008 British television series debuts
2009 British television series endings
2000s British documentary television series
Bravo (British TV channel) original programming
English-language television shows